"This Used to Be Our Town" is a single by Canadian country music artist Jason McCoy. Released in 1995, it was the fourth single from his album Jason McCoy. The song reached #1 on the RPM Country Tracks chart in July 1995.

Chart performance

Year-end charts

References

1995 singles
Jason McCoy songs
Songs written by Chris Lindsey
1995 songs
Songs written by Jason McCoy
MCA Records singles